Progress 8, was a Soviet uncrewed Progress cargo spacecraft which was launched in 1980 to resupply the Salyut 6 space station.

Spacecraft
Progress 8 was a Progress 7K-TG spacecraft. The eighth of forty three to be launched, it had the serial number 108. The Progress 7K-TG spacecraft was the first generation Progress, derived from the Soyuz 7K-T and intended for uncrewed logistics missions to space stations in support of the Salyut programme. On some missions the spacecraft were also used to adjust the orbit of the space station.

The spacecraft were powered by chemical batteries, and could operate in free flight for up to three days, remaining docked to the station for up to thirty.

Launch
Progress 8 launched on 27 March 1980 from the Baikonur Cosmodrome in the Kazakh Soviet Socialist Republic. It used a Soyuz-U rocket.

Docking
Progress 8 docked with Salyut 6 on 29 March 1980 at 20:01 UTC.

See also

 1980 in spaceflight
 List of Progress missions
 List of uncrewed spaceflights to Salyut space stations

References

Progress (spacecraft) missions
1980 in the Soviet Union
Spacecraft launched in 1980
Spacecraft which reentered in 1980
Spacecraft launched by Soyuz-U rockets